Sitravatinib (MGCD516) is an experimental drug for the treatment of cancer. It is a small molecule inhibitor of multiple tyrosine kinases.

Sitravatinib is being developed by Mirati Therapeutics.

Ongoing phase II trials include a trial for liposcarcoma, a combination trial for non-small cell lung cancer, and a combination trial with nivolumab for renal cell carcinoma. Sitravatinib is being evaluated in ongoing trials in patients with advanced non-small cell lung cancer, including in a combination trial with nivolumab in those who are resistant to checkpoint inhibitor therapy, and certain patients who are naïve to checkpoint inhibitor therapy.

References 

Experimental cancer drugs
Tyrosine kinase inhibitors